The Kurukshetra War, also called the Mahabharata War, is a war described in the Mahabharata. The conflict arose from a dynastic succession struggle between two groups of cousins, the Kauravas and the Pandavas, for the throne of Hastinapura. The war laid the foundation for the Bhagavad Gita.

The historicity of the war remains the subject of scholarly discussion. The Battle of the Ten Kings, mentioned in the Rigveda, may have formed the core of the Kurukshetra war's story. The war was greatly expanded and modified in the Mahabharata's account, which makes it dubious. Attempts have been made to assign a historical date to the Kurukshetra war, with research suggesting  BCE. However, popular tradition claims that the war marks the transition to the Kali Yuga, dating it to  BCE.

The war took place in Kurukshetra. Despite only spanning eighteen days, the war takes more than a quarter of the Mahabharata. The narrative describes individual battles, deaths of various heroes on both sides, war diplomacy, meetings and discussions among characters, military formations, and weapons used. The chapters dealing with the war are considered among the oldest in the Mahabharata.

Background

The Mahābhārata is an account of the life and deeds of several generations of a ruling dynasty called the Kuru clan. Central to the epic is an account of a war that took place between two rival families belonging to this clan. Kurukshetra (literally "field of the Kurus") was the battleground on which the Kurukshetra War was fought. Kurukshetra was also known as Dharmakshetra (the "field of Dharma"), or field of righteousness. The first Mahābhārata says that this site was chosen because a sin committed on this land was forgiven on account of the sanctity of the land.

Historicity and dating

Literary traces
The historicity of the Kurukshetra War is subject to scholarly discussion and dispute. It is possible that the Battle of the Ten Kings, mentioned in the Rigveda, may have "formed the 'nucleus' of the story" of the Kurukshetra war, though it was greatly expanded and modified in the Mahābhārata'''s account making the Mahābhārata's version of very dubious historicity. Although the Kurukshetra War is not mentioned in Vedic literature, its prominence in later literature led British Indologist A. L. Basham to conclude that there was a great battle at Kurukshetra which, "magnified to titanic proportions, formed the basis of the story of the greatest of India's epics, the Mahābhārata". Acknowledging that later "generations looked upon it as marking an end of an epoch", he suggested that rather than being a civil war it might have been "a muddled recollection of the conquest of the Kurus by a tribe of Mongol type from the hills". He saw it as useless to the historian and dates the war to the ninth century BCE based on archaeological evidence and "some evidence in the Brahmana literature itself to show that it cannot have been much earlier".

Puranic literature presents genealogical lists associated with the Mahābhārata narrative. There are two pieces of evidence of the Puranas: there is the direct statement that there were 1,015 (or 1,050) years between the birth of Parikshit (Arjun's grandson) and the accession of Mahapadma Nanda, commonly dated to 382 BCE, which would yield an estimate of about 1400 BCE for the Bharata battle, which would imply improbably long reigns on average for the kings listed in the genealogies.

There are also analyses of parallel genealogies in the Puranas between the times of Adhisimakrishna (Parikshit's great-grandson) and Mahapadma Nanda. Pargiter estimated 26 generations by averaging 10 different dynastic lists and assuming 18 years for the average duration of a reign, arrived at an estimate of 850 BCE for Adhisimakrishna and approximately 950 BCE for the Bharata battle.

Scholarly dating
Despite the inconclusiveness of the data, attempts have been made to assign a historical date to the Kurukshetra War. The existing text of the Mahābhārata went through many revisions, and mostly belongs to the period between c. 500 BCE and 400 CE. Within the frame story of the Mahābhārata, the kings Parikshit and Janamejaya are featured significantly as scions of the Kuru clan, and Michael Witzel concludes that the general setting of the epic has a historical precedent in the Vedic period, where the Kuru kingdom was the center of political power during roughly 1200 to 800 BCE. According to Professor Alf Hiltebeitel, the Mahābhārata is essentially mythological. Indian historian Upinder Singh wrote:

According to Finnish Sindhologist Asko Parpola, the war may have taken place during the later phase of the Painted Grey Ware, c/ 750–350 BCE.

Popular tradition and archaeoastronomy
Popular tradition holds that the war marks the transition to Kali Yuga and dates it to 3102 BCE. A number of other proposals have been put forward:
 Vedveer Arya gives a date of 3162 BCE, by distinguishing between the Śaka and Śakanta eras and applying correction of 60 years to the date given in popular tradition and based on Aihole inscription.
 B. N. Achar used planetarium software to argue that the Mahabharata War took place in 3067 BCE.
 Dieter Koch dates the war to 1198 BCE using planetarium software on the basis super-conjunctions mentioned in the text. 
 Kesheo Lakshman Daftari, one of the members of the Calendar Reform Committee which prepared the Indian national calendar, holds that the war took place in 1197 BCE.
 V. S. Dubey claims that the war happened near 950 BCE.

Associations with archaeological cultures
Indian archeologist B. B. Lal used the same approach with a more conservative assumption of the average reign to estimate a date of 836 BCE and correlated it with archaeological evidence from Painted Grey Ware (PGW) sites, the association being strong between PGW artifacts and places mentioned in the epic. John Keay confirmed it and also dated the battle to have taken place in 950 BCE.

According to Parpola, the war may have taken place during the later phase of the Painted Grey Ware culture, c. 750-350 BCE. He noted that the Pandava heroes are not being mentioned in the Vedic literature from before the Grhyasutras. Parpola suggests that the Pandavas were Iranic migrants, who came to south Asia around 800 BCE.

Excavations in Sinauli unearthed burials with the remains of carts belonging to the Ochre Coloured Pottery culture (OCP).  Several authors proposeed to relate the Rig Vedic culture and the war to the OCP, instead of the PGW. While the carts are dated to 1800–1500 BCE (±150), Gupta and Mani state that "in the present state of archaeological evidence OCP seems to be a stronger contender for the Mahābhārata association", dating the war to the 4th millennium BCE. Parpola sees the finds as ox-pulled chariots, indicating support for his proposal for a first wave of Indo-Aryan migrations into the Indian subcontinent at the beginning of the 2nd millennium BCE, prior to the migration of the Rig Vedic people.

Mahabharata account of the war

Beginning
In the beginning, Sanjaya gives a description of the various continents of the Earth, the other planets, and focuses on the Indian subcontinent, then gives an elaborate list of kingdoms, tribes, provinces, cities, towns, villages, rivers, mountains, and forests of the ancient Indian subcontinent (Bharata Varsha). He also explains the military formations adopted by each side on each day, the death of each hero and the details of each war-racing.

Krishna's peace mission

As a last attempt at peace is called for in Rajadharma, Krishna travels to the kingdom of Hastinapur to persuade the Kauravas to see reason, avoid bloodshed of their kin, and to embark upon a peaceful path with him as the "divine" ambassador of the Pandavas. Duryodhana is insulted that Krishna turns down his invitation to accommodate himself in the royal palace. Duryodhana plots to arrest Krishna and insult, humiliate, and defame him in front of the entire royal court of Hastinapur as a challenge to the prestige of the Pandavas and declaration of an act of open war.

At the formal presentation of the peace proposal by Krishna in the Kuru Mahasabha at the court of Hastinapur, Krishna asks Duryodhana to return Indraprastha to the Pandavas and restore the status quo, or at least give five villages, one for each of the Pandavas; Duryodhana refuses. Krishna's peace proposals are ignored and dismissed, and Duryodhana publicly orders his soldiers to arrest Krishna despite warnings from the elders. Krishna laughs and displays his divine form, radiating intense light. He curses Duryodhana that his downfall was certain at the hands of the one who was sworn to tear off his thigh. His peace mission utterly insulted by Duryodhana, Krishna returns to the Pandava camp at Upaplavya to inform the Pandavas that the only course left to uphold the principles of virtue and righteousness is war. During his return, Krishna meets Karna, Kunti's firstborn (before Yudhishthira), and asks him to help his brothers and fight on the side of dharma. However, as he is being helped by Duryodhana, Karna says to Krishna that he would battle against the Pandavas as he had a debt to pay.

War preparations

Duryodhana and Arjuna go to Krishna at Dwarka to ask for his and his army's help. Duryodhana arrives first and finds Krishna asleep. Duryodhana chooses a seat at Krishna's head and waits for him to awaken, while Arjuna sits and waits at Krishna's feet. When Krishna woke up, he saw Arjuna first and gave him the first right to make his request. Krishna tells Arjuna and Duryodhana that he would give the Narayani Sena to one side and himself as a non-combatant to the other. Since Arjuna is given the first opportunity to choose, Duryodhana worries that Arjuna would choose the mighty army of Krishna. When given the choice of either Krishna's army or Krishna himself on their side, Arjuna chooses Krishna,. Arjuna asks Krishna to be his charioteer, who agrees. Both Duryodhana and Arjuna returned satisfied.

The Pandavas gather their armies while camping at Upaplavya in Virata's territory. Contingents arrive from across the country.

Pandava army

Yudhishthira asks his brothers to organize their army. The Pandavas have seven akshauhinis with the help of their allies. After consulting his commanders, the Pandavas appoint Dhrishtadyumna as the supreme commander of the Pandava army.

Kaurava army
The Kaurava army is made up of 11 akshauhinis. Duryodhana asks Bhishma to command the Kaurava army. Bhishma accepts on the condition that, while he would fight the battle sincerely, he would not harm the five Pandava brothers. He also says that Karna would rather not fight under him, but serve as Duryodhana's bodyguard as long as he was in the battlefield. Having little choice, Duryodhana agrees to Bhishma's conditions and makes him the supreme commander of the Kaurava army, while Karna is debarred from fighting. Karna joins the war later when Bhishma is severely wounded by Arjuna.

Neutral parties
The kingdom of Bhojakata, Vidura, and Balarama are the neutral parties in this war. Rukmi, king of Bhojakata, wants to join the war, but Arjuna refuses because he had lost to Krishna during Rukmini's swayamvara and he boasted about his war strength and army, and Duryodhana does not want Arjuna's reject. Vidura does not want to see bloodshed and is insulted by Duryodhana.

Course of the war

Before the battle

The Mahābhārata states that in the year in which the war took place, three solar eclipses took place within a thirty-day period; eclipses are considered ill omens in Hindu astrology.

On the first day of the war, as would be on all the following days, the Kaurava army stood facing west and the Pandava army east. The Pandava army was organised by Yudhishthira and Arjuna in the diamond or Vajra formation.

Ten akshauhinis of the Kaurava army were arranged in a phalanx. The eleventh was put under the immediate command of Bhishma, partly to protect him. The safety of the supreme commander Bhishma was central to Duryodhana's strategy, as he had placed all his hope on the great warrior's abilities.

The Bhagavad Gita

When the war is declared and the two armies face each other, Arjuna realises that he would have to kill his dear granduncle Bhishma and his respected teacher Drona. Despondent and confused about what is right and what is wrong, Arjuna turns to Krishna for divine advice and teachings. Krishna, who Arjuna chose as his charioteer, advised him of his duty. Krishna instructs Arjuna not to yield to degrading impotence and to fight his kin. He also reminds him that it is a war between righteousness and unrighteousness (dharma and adharma), and it is Arjuna's duty to slay anyone who supported the cause of unrighteousness, or sin. Krishna reveals his divine form and explains that he is born on earth in each eon when evil raises its head.

Before the battle begins, Yudhishthira drops his weapons, takes off his armor, and walks towards the Kaurava army with folded hands in prayer. He falls on Bhishma's feet to seek his blessing for success in battle, and he is blessed. Yudhishthira returned to his chariot and the battle was ready to commence.

Day 1
The Pandavas suffered heavy losses and are defeated at the end of the first day. Virata's sons, Uttara and Sweta, are slain by Shalya and Bhishma. Krishna consoles Yudhishthira saying that eventually, victory would be his.

Day 2
Arjuna, realizing that something needs to be done quickly to reverse the Pandava losses, decides to kill Bhishma. Krishna locates Bhishma's chariot and steers Arjuna toward him. Arjuna tries to engage Bhishma in a duel, but the Kaurava soldiers protect him and attack Arjuna. Arjuna and Bhishma fight a fierce battle over hours. Drona and Dhrishtadyumna similarly engage in a duel, and Drona defeats Dhrishtadyumna, who is saved by Bhima. Duryodhana sends the troops of Kalinga to attack Bhima and most of them, including the king of Kalinga, are killed. Bhishma comes to relieve the battered Kalinga forces. Satyaki, who was assisting Bhima, shoots at Bhishma's charioteer and kills him. Bhishma's horses bolt and carry Bhishma away from the battlefield.

Day 3

The Kauravas concentrate their attack on Arjuna, whose chariot becomes covered with arrows and javelins. Arjuna builds a fortification around his chariot with an unending stream of arrows from his bow. Abhimanyu and Satyaki join forces to defeat Shakuni's Gandhara forces. Bhima and Ghatotkacha attack Duryodhana in the rear. Bhima's arrows hit Duryodhana, who collapses in his chariot. His charioteer drives him off the battlefield, and Duryodhana's forces scatter. Bhishma restores order and Duryodhana returns to lead the army. He is angry at Bhishma for what he saw as leniency towards the five Pandava brothers, and spoke harshly of him. Bhishma, stung by this unfair charge, returns to the battlefield.

Arjuna attacks Bhishma to restore order. Arjuna and Bhishma duel again.

Day 4

Bhishma commands the Kaurava army to move on the offensive. When the Kauravas form a chakravyuha, Abhimanyu enters it but is surrounded and attacked by Kaurava princes. Arjuna joins to help him. Bhima appears and attacks the Kauravas. Duryodhana sends a huge force of elephants at Bhima, who leaves his chariot and attacks them singlehandedly with his iron mace. The elephants scatter and stampede into the Kaurava forces. Duryodhana orders an all-out attack on Bhima, who kills eight of Duryodhana's brothers before being struck by an arrow from Dushasana, the second-eldest Kaurava, in the chest and sat down in his chariot dazed.

At the end of the fourth day, Duryodhana goes to Bhisma and asks him how could the Pandavas, facing a superior force against them, have the upper hand. Bhishma says that the Pandavas have justice on their side and advises Duryodhana to seek peace.

Day 5
The Pandava army suffers from Bhishma's attacks. Satyaki is being beaten by Drona, but Bhima drives by and rescues him. Arjuna kills thousands of soldiers sent by Duryodhana to attack him. Bhima engages Bhishma in a duel with no clear winner. Drupada and his son Shikandi go to help Bhima, but they are stopped by Vikarna, one of Duryodhana's brothers, who attacks and injures them badly.

Day 6
Drona kills many Pandava soldiers and both armies' formations are broken. Bhima penetrates the Kaurava formation and attacks Duryodhana, who is defeated but rescued. The Upapandavas (sons of Draupadi) fight against Ashwathama and destroy his chariot.

Day 7
Drona kills Shanka, one of Virata's son. Yuyuthsu is injured by Kripacharya in a sword fight. Nakula and Sahadeva fight Duryodhana's brothers but are overwhelmed by the number of them.

Day 8
Bhima kills 17 of Dhritarashtra's sons. Iravan, the son of Arjuna, kills five of Shakuni's brothers. Duryodhana deploys the Rakshasa fighter Alamvusha, who kills Iravan.

Day 9
Bhishma destroys Pandava armies. Arjuna heads to Bhishma but fights him half-heartedly. Krishna, overwhelmed by anger at the apparent inability of Arjuna to kill Bhishma, rushes towards the Kaurava commander. Ghatotkacha kills the demon Alambusha.

Realising that the war could not be won as long as Bhishma was standing, Krishna suggests placing a eunuch in the field to face him.

Day 10

The Pandavas put Shikhandi, who had been a woman in a prior life, in front of Bhishma, as Bhishma has taken a vow not to attack a woman. Shikhandi's arrows fell on Bhishma without hindrance. Arjuna positions himself behind Shikhandi, protecting himself from Bhishma's attack and aimed his arrows at the weak points in Bhishma's armor and defeats him.

The Kauravas and Pandavas gathered around Bhishma and at his request, Arjuna places three arrows under Bhishma's head to support it. Bhishma had promised his father, King Shantanu, that he would live until Hastinapur was secured from all directions. To keep this promise, Bhishma used the boon of Ichcha Mrityu (self-wished death) given to him by his father. After the war ended, when Hastinapura had become safe from all sides and after giving lessons on politics and Vishnu Sahasranama to the Pandavas, Bhishma dies on the first day of Uttarayana.

Day 11
With Bhishma unable to continue, Karna joins the battlefield. Duryodhana makes Drona the supreme commander of the Kaurava forces according to Karna's advice. Duryodhana wants to capture Yudhishthira alive; killing Yudhishthira in battle would only enrage the Pandavas more, while holding him as a hostage would be strategically useful. Drona cuts down Yudhishthira's bow, and Arjuna stops Drona from capturing Yudhishthira.

Day 12
Drona tells Duryodhana that it would be difficult to capture Yudhishthira as long as Arjuna is present. He orders the Samsaptakas (the Trigarta warriors headed by Susharma, who had vowed to either conquer or die) to keep Arjuna busy in a remote part of the battlefield, an order which they readily obey on account of their old hostilities with the Pandava scion. Arjuna defeats them before the afternoon, then faces Bhagadatta, who had been creating havoc among the Pandava troops, and defeated Bhima, Abhimanyu and Satyaki. Arjuna and Bhagadatta fight and the latter is killed. Drona continues his attempts to capture Yudhishthira, however his attacks were repelled by Prativindhya that day. The Pandavas, however, fought hard and delivered severe blows to the Kaurava army, frustrating Drona's plans.

Day 13
Drona's goal remains to capture Yudhishthira. Among the Pandavas, only Arjuna and Krishna knew how to penetrate this formation, and to prevent them from doing so, the Samsaptakas led by Susharma challenge Arjuna and keep him busy at a remote part of the battlefield the whole day.

On the other side of the battlefield, the remaining four Pandavas and their allies find it impossible to break Drona's chakra formation. Yudhishthira instructed Abhimanyu to break the chakra/padma formation. Abhimanyu knows how to enter the chakra formation, but not know how to exit, so the Pandava follow to protect him from any potential danger. As soon as Abhimanyu enters the formation, Jayadratha stops them with help from a boon obtained from Shiva, and defeats Bhima and Satyaki.

Inside thechakra/kamala formation, Abhimanyu kills many warriors, including Vrihadvala (the ruler of Kosala); the ruler of Asmaka, Martikavata (the son of Kritavarma); Rukmaratha (the son of Shalya); and Shalya's younger brother, Lakshmana (the son of Duryodhana) and Dushasan's second son, Dushmanara.

The Kaurava commanders devise a strategy to prevent Abhimanyu from causing further damage to their force. Following Drona's instructions, six warriors attacks Abhimanyu and deprived him of his chariot, bow, sword, and shield. Abhimanyu picks up a mace; smashes Ashwatthma's chariot (upon which the latter fled); and slays one of Shakuni's brothers numerous troops, and elephants before being killed by the son of Dussasana in a mace-fight.

Upon learning of the death of his son, Arjuna vows to kill Jayadratha.

Day 14

While searching for Jayadratha on the battlefield, Arjuna kills seven akshauhinis of Kaurav soldiers. By Shakuni's plot, Duryodhana hides Jayadratha in their camp. Arjuna uses divyastra to carry Jayadratha's head to his father leading to his own father's death. Many maharathis including Drona and Karna try to protect Jayadratha but fail to do so. Arjuna warns that everyone who supported adharma would be killed.

While Arjuna destroys the rest of the Shakatavyuha, Vikarna, the third eldest Kaurava, challenges Arjuna to an archery fight. Arjuna asks Bhima to kill Vikarna, but Bhima refuses because Vikarna had defended the Pandavas during the Draupadi Vastrapaharanam. Bhima and Vikarna shoot arrows at each other, before Bhima kills Vikarna with his mace. Drona kills Vrihatkshatra, the ruler of Kekaya, and Dhrishtakethu, the ruler of Chedi.

Dushasana's first son, Drumsena, is slain by Prativindya, the eldest son of Draupadi and Yudhishthira, in a duel. When the bright moon rose, Ghatotkacha killed warriors like Alambusha and Alayudha while flying in the air. Karna fights him and releases Vasava Shakti, a divine weapon given to him by Indra. Ghatotkacha grows in size and falls on the Kaurava army as he dies, killing an akshauhini'' of them.

Day 15
After Drupada and Virata are killed by Drona, Bhima and Dhrishtadyumna fight him. Because Drona has the Brahmanda astra, Krishna tells Yudhishthira that Drona would give up his arms if his son Ashwatthama were dead. Yudhishthir lies to drona

Which disheartens Dronacharya and 
he lays  his weapons doen before being killed by Dhrishtadyumna to avenge his father's death and satisfy his vow. Kunti secretly meets Karna and asks him to spare the Pandavas, as they were his younger brothers. Karna promises Kunti that he would spare them except for Arjuna, but also added that he would not fire the same weapon against Arjun twice. On the same day, a fierce battle took between Karna  and ghatotkacha which ended in Karna killing ghatotkacha.

Day 16

Karna is made the supreme commander of the Kuru army. He is surrounded and attacked by Pandava generals, who are unable to defeat him. Karna inflicts heavy damage on the Pandava army.

Day 17

Karna's son Banasena is killed by Bhima then Bhima swings his mace and shatters Dushasana's chariot. Vrishasena defeats bhima, sahadeva and the upapandavas. 
Bhima seizes Dushasana, rips his right arm from his shoulder, and kills him, tearing open his chest, drinking his blood, and carrying some to smear on Draupadi's untied hair, fulfilling his vow made when Draupadi was humiliated. Arjuna kills Susharma, Trigartas, and Samsaptakas and Karna's first son, Vrishasena. Karna later defeats , Satyaki, Shikhandi, the Pandava brothers Nakula, Sahadeva, Yudhishthira and Bhima in battle but spares their lives. Karna kills multiple Akshounis of the pandava army and kills the Panchalas. Karna resumes dueling with Arjuna. During their duel, Karna's chariot wheel gets stuck in the mud and Karna asks for a pause. Krishna reminded Arjuna about Karna's ruthlessness on Abhimanyu while he was similarly left without chariot and weapons. Hearing his son's fate, Arjuna shoots an arrow that decapitates Karna.

Day 18
Shalya takes over as the commander-in-chief of the remaining Kaurava forces. Yudhishthira kills him in spear combat and Sahadeva kills Shakuni. Nakula kills Shakuni's son Uluka. Realizing that he had been defeated, Duryodhana flees the battlefield and takes refuge in the lake, where the Pandavas catch up with him. Under the supervision of the now-returned Balarama, a battle between Bhima and Duryodhana begins. Bhima breaks the rules under instructions from Krishna and strikes Duryodhana below the waist, leaving him mortally wounded.

Ashwatthama, Kripacharya, and Kritavarma gather at Duryodhana's deathbed and promise to avenge him. With Ashwatthama as general, they attack the Pandavas' camp later that night and killed all the Pandavas' remaining army including their children.

Aftermath

Only eleven major warriors survive the war: the five Pandavas, Krishna, Satyaki, Ashwatthama, Kripacharya, Yuyutsu,and Kritavarma. Yudhishthira is crowned king of Hastinapur. After ruling for 36 years, he renounces the throne and passes the title on to Arjuna's grandson Parikshit. Draupadi and four Pandavas—Bhima, Arjuna, Nakula and Sahadeva—die during the journey. Yudhishthira, the lone survivor and being of pious heart, is invited by dharma to enter the heavens as a mortal.

See also
 Hastinapur
 Indraprastha
 Kauravas
 Historicity of the Mahabharata

Notes

References

Sources

External links

 Kurukshetra (town)
 Dating the Kurukshetra War
 Kurukshetra War: Is it real or just a myth? 
 Explanation of military formations (vyuhas) used in the war

Kurukshetra
 
Mahabharata
Puranic chronology
War in mythology
Wars of succession involving the states and peoples of Asia
2nd-millennium BC conflicts